This is a list of governors of the Roman province of Bithynia et Pontus:

As a Senatorial province 
 Gaius Papirius Carbo (61—59 BC);
 Gaius Memmius (57—56 BC);
 Gaius Caecilius Cornutus (56 BC);
 Publius Silius (51 BC);
 Aulus Plautius (49—48 BC);
 Gaius Vibius Pansa Caetronianus (47/46 BC);
 Quintus Marcius Crispus (45 BC);
 Lucius Tillius Cimber (44 BC);
 Gnaeus Domitius Ahenobarbus (40—34 BC);
 Thorius Flaccus (29/28 — 28/27 BC);
 Appius Claudius Pulcher (27/26 BC);
 Gaius Marcius Censorinus (c. 14/13 BC);
 Lucius Licinius C[...] (c. AD 11/12);
 Manius Ota[cilius Crassus?] (reign of Augustus?);
 Marcus Granius Marcellus (AD 14/15);
 Publius Vitellius (AD 17/18);
 Lucius Mindius Balbus (c. 43–47);
 Gaius Cadius Rufus (47/48);
 Publius Pasidienus Firmus (48/49 — 49/50);
 Lucius Mindius Pollio (after 42);
 Lucius Dunius Severus (after 42);
 Attius Laco (54/55?);
 Marcus Tarquitius Priscus (59/60?);
 Petronius Niger (between 62 and 69);
 Lucius Venuleius Montanus (c. 63);
 Marcus Plancius Varus (70/71? or 71/72?);
 Marcus Maecius Rufus (c. 71/72 or 72/73);
 Marcus Salvidienus Proculus (c. 75/76);
 Marcus Salvidienus Asprenas (c. 76/77);
 Velius Paulus (c. 79/80);
 Lucius Minicius Rufus (81/82?);
 Aulus Bucius Lappius Maximus (82/83?);
 Tiberius Julius Celsus Polemaeanus (c. 83/84);
 Lucius Julius Marinus (88/89 or 89/90);
 Tullius Justus (96/97);
 Gaius Julius Bassus (101/102?);
 Varenus Rufus (105/106);
 Anicius Maximus (before 108/109);
 Publius Severus Calvus (108/109);
 Pliny the Younger (Gaius Plinius Caecilius Secundus) (c. 109 — 111) ;
 Gaius Julius Cornutus Tertullus (111 — 114/115?);
 Quintus Cornelius Senecio Annianus (reign of Hadrian)
 Gaius Julius Severus (134)
 Quintus Voconius Saxa Fidus (142/143 ?)
 Lucius Coelius Festus (146/147 ?)
 Lucius Hedius Rufus Lollianus Avitus (159)
 Marcus Roscius Murena (c. 161/162)

As an Imperial province 
 Lucius Albinius Saturninus (c. 180)
 Severus (before 183)
 Marcus Didius Severus Julianus (between 186 and 189)
 Lucius Fabius Cilo (193/194)
 Marcus Silius Messala (between 193 and 197)
 Quintus Tineius Sacerdos (198/199)
 Marcus Cl(audius) Demetrius (between 199 and 217)
 Tiberius Claudius Callipianus Italicus (between 202 and 205)
 Aelius Antipater (after 204)
 Gaius Claudius Attalus Paterculianus (between 193 and 214)
 Caecilius Aristo (215/216 ? - 217/218)
 (Claudius Aelius ?) Pollio (c. 218)
 Lucius Egnatius Victor Lollianus (between 230 and 235)
 Marcus Aurelius Artemidorus (245/246 - 247/248)
 Velleius Macrinus (c. 269)

References 

Bithynia and Pontus
 
Roman governors of Bithynia et Pontus
Bithynia et Pontus